Bread N' Butter is a Filipino business and travel show produced by DSR Multimedia Productions that aired on UNTV. The program described itself as a show "that would inspire Filipinos to discover their entrepreneurial sense". The program format is similar to a travel documentary where the main hosts venture and visit various kinds of business establishments. It also featured solutions to business problems, which they claim to be helpful to the business-minded audience. It was hosted by Arlene Razon, Kitt Meily and Rodel Flordeliz  and aired every Sunday on UNTV. The television show used Taglish language as its means of communication.

Bread N' Butter ceased airing on July 12, 2016, and it was replaced by Serbisyong Kasangbahay on July 18. It coincided with the station rebranding from UNTV Life to UNTV News and Rescue.

Hosts
Final hosts
 Rodel Flordeliz (2008-2016)
 Kitt Meily (2008-2016)
 Arlene Razon (2008-2016)
Former hosts
 Jorel Ramirez (2004-2005)
 Lynley Teng (2004-2005, 2008)

Awards

References 

2. Bread N' Butter on UNTVweb.com

External links
 Bread n' Butter at Wordpress.com
 TV Schedule at Clickthecity.com
 Bread N' Butter on UNTVweb.com, UNTVweb Official Website

Business-related television series
UNTV (Philippines) original programming
2008 Philippine television series debuts
2016 Philippine television series endings
Philippine documentary television series
Filipino-language television shows
English-language television shows
Members Church of God International